Farheen (born as Farheen Khan), also known as Bindiya in the South Indian film industry, is an Indian actress, who has primarily worked in Bollywood, Kannada cinema and Tamil cinema. She made her debut with Jaan Tere Naam opposite Ronit Roy in 1992. She was famous as a look-alike of Madhuri Dixit.

Career
Farheen worked in films including Aag Ka Toofan, Fauj, Halli Meshtru and Nazar Ke Samne but her only popular film is Jaan Tere Naam.

In 2014, Farheen announced her comeback to films in a project directed by Deepak Balraj Vij, the director of her debut film Jaan Tere Naam.

Partial filmography

Personal life 
Farheen was born in a Muslim family, and is married to former Indian cricketer Manoj Prabhakar and lives in Delhi, with their two children, Raahil and Manavansh and her father-in-law. Prabhakar's eldest son Rohan from his first wife, Sandhya, and Rohan's wife also live with the family.

References

External links
 

Indian film actresses
Actresses in Tamil cinema
Actresses in Hindi cinema
Actresses in Malayalam cinema
Living people
Year of birth missing (living people)
20th-century Indian actresses
Actresses in Kannada cinema